Operation Keystone is a 1986 video game published by Overt Strategic Simulations.

Gameplay
Operation Keystone is a game in which the player is in command of the Gato-class submarine USS Tang against the ships of the Japanese Navy.

Reception
Mark Bausman reviewed the game for Computer Gaming World, and stated that "This reviewer found Operation Keystone to be an excellent game that maintains a good feel of real-time combat activity."

References

1986 video games